The 1968 Cork Intermediate Hurling Championship was the 59th staging of the Cork Intermediate Hurling Championship since its establishment by the Cork County Board in 1909. The draw for the opening round fixtures took place on 28 January 1968. The championship ran from 7 April to 29 September 1968.

The final was played on 29 September 1968 at the Athletic Grounds in Cork, between St. Vincent's and Youghal, in what was their first ever meeting in the final. St. Vincent's won the match by 2-11 to 1-12 to claim their first ever championship title.

Results

First round

Second round

Quarter-finals

Semi-finals

Final

References

Cork Intermediate Hurling Championship
Cork Intermediate Hurling Championship